Watery fig is a common name for several plants and may refer to:

Ficus fraseri
Ficus opposita